Tiana Sumanasekera (born September 15, 2007) is an American artistic gymnast and a member of the United States women's national gymnastics team.  She is the 2021 Junior Pan American Games champion on vault.

Early life 
Sumanasekera was born to Rajitha and Ruwangi Sumanasekera in 2007.  She started gymnastics in 2013.

Gymnastics career

Junior

2021 
Sumanasekera competed at the 2021 Winter Cup where she placed seventh in the all-around.  She next competed at the American Classic where she placed eighth in the all-around but won gold on floor exercise and silver on vault.  Sumanasekera competed at the U.S. Classic where she finished tenth in the all-around.

In November Sumanasekera was selected to represent the United States at the inaugural Junior Pan American Games alongside Katelyn Jong, Madray Johnson, and Kailin Chio.  While there she helped the United States place first as a team and individually she won gold on vault.

2022 
Sumanasekera competed at the 2022 Winter Cup where she finished seventh in the all-around but first on vault and floor exercise.  As a result she was selected to compete at the upcoming DTB Pokal Team Challenge in Stuttgart alongside Myli Lew, Ella Kate Parker, Ella Murphy, and Hezly Rivera.  While there Sumanasekera helped the team finish first and individually she won gold on vault and silver on balance beam.  In April Sumanasekera competed at the 2022 City of Jesolo Trophy alongside Lew, Murphy, Madray Johnson, Zoey Molomo, and Gabby Van Frayen. They won the team event and Sumanasekera won the all-around competition.  During event finals she picked up an additional three gold medals on vault, balance beam, and floor exercise.  

In July Sumanasekera was selected to compete at the Pan American Championships alongside Molomo, Dulcy Caylor, and Alicia Zhou, where she helped the United States win the team gold and won an additional three medals in the vault, balance beam, and floor exercise event finals.

Competitive history

References

External links
 
 

2007 births
Living people
American female artistic gymnasts
U.S. women's national team gymnasts
People from Pleasanton, California
21st-century American women
American people of Sri Lankan descent